"Money in the Bank" is a hip hop single from Lil Scrappy's debut album Bred 2 Die Born 2 Live, featuring Young Buck.  The video has cameo appearances including Lil Jon, Lloyd Banks, Chamillionaire, Project Pat, Spider Loc, T-Pain, David Banner, Nick Cannon, All Star Cashville Prince, Diamond, Princess of Crime Mob, Young Hot Rod, Katt Williams and Ike Dirty.

Background
Originally appeared on Young Buck's Mixtape, Case Dismissed!

XXL, as well as other media outlets, have mistakenly credited Lil' Jon as the producer of this song, most likely because he appears in the video and the beat sounds like a typical Lil' Jon beat. Also the beat is similar to a slower version of Lil' Jon's "Get Low."

MTV/MTV2 has aired a Making the Video episode for this single.

The single version of the song features the famous "I'm rich bitch!" quote from Dave Chappelle in the intro and outro. This is not heard on the album version and the music video.

In 2009 R&B singer Amerie recorded the 'answer back' version.  This version was released via her mixtape "Because I Love It - Volume 1".  The answer back was later merged with the original to create a remix.

The song is featured in the game soundtrack for the wrestling video game WWE SmackDown vs. Raw 2007, in conjunction to the Money in the Bank ladder match featured in the game. It had been rumored that WWE would use the song as the official theme for their Money in the Bank Pay-Per-View in July 2010, but it has been confirmed that the theme used was "Money" by I Fight Dragons.

Track listing
 U.S. EP
 "Money in the Bank (radio edit)"
 "Money in the Bank (album version)"
 "Money in the Bank (instrumental)"

Charts

Weekly charts

Year-end charts

References

Lil Scrappy songs
Young Buck songs
2006 singles
Songs written by Young Buck
2006 songs
Songs written by 50 Cent
G-Unit Records singles
Crunk songs